Daughter of Venice is an historical fiction/young adult novel, published in 2002 by Random House Inc.

Plot summary
This story follows Donata, daughter of a wealthy noble in 1592.

Donata Mocenigo, daughter to one of the city's noble families, leads a life of wealthy privilege. But constrained by the strict rules of etiquette a young noblewoman must observe, she longs to throw off her veil and wander freely around the vibrant city she can see only from her balcony. So Donata comes up with a daring plan to escape the palazzo and explore - a plan that will change her own and her family's lives forever.

Donata Mocenigo is the daughter of a wealthy Venetian noble family, but resents her lack of freedom. Eventually she and her sisters conspire to let her dress up as a poor boy, and wander the city freely - her twin sister, Laura, taking her place around the household. On her first visit outside her palazzo, she injures her foot, wanders into the Jewish Ghetto, and meets a young man called Noé, who helps her and gives her a pair of shoes, in return for her working off the debt for him at a printers' workshop, copying out handbills.

Donata does so for a month, getting closer to Noé. Meanwhile, at home, she and Laura persuade their father to allow them to join their brothers in tutorials - Donata begins learning to read and write, and about architecture, business and history. Laura, however, is less interested, and quits tutorials after a short time.

As Donata and Laura are the second and third daughters in their family, and only the first (and sometimes second) daughter normally marries, both of them hope to find husbands instead of being sent to convents like their younger sisters, Maria and Paolina. However, during a dinnertime discussion, Donata's father announces that he has found not one, but two husbands - one for their older sister Andriana, and one for Donata, who has been selected partly because of being so hardworking. However, since it is Laura who has been working hard in her stead while she wanders around Venice, she feels horribly guilty and decides that she cannot get married - partly from loyalty to Laura, and partly because she is falling in love with Noé.

Eventually, she comes up with a plan: she writes a denunciation of herself, claiming that she has converted to Judaism, so that she will be embroiled in a scandal, withdrawn from the betrothal, and Laura can take her place. In the process her family discover that she has been leaving the palazzo, alone, but eventually the plan does succeed. Donata has no idea what her future will hold, but eventually her father reveals that her tutor, Messer Zonico, has gone to the University of Padua to persuade them to allow her to take up the doctorate course in philosophy. Donata is overjoyed, and hopes some day to become a tutor, like the one she admires, to other noble girls.

Reception
Kirkus Reviews described Daughter of Venice as "Compelling historical fiction", noted "Fascinating tidbits of information about Venice’s society, politics, history, and economy find their way painlessly into the narrative." and concluded "While readers will be rightly skeptical at Donata’s speedy mastery of not only written Venetian but Latin as well, they will nevertheless find themselves absorbed in her story and the snapshot of her city that it provides."  while Publishers Weekly wrote "Eschewing a traditional romance, Napoli forges a plot with contemporary elements." and "Enjoying the tour of historical Venice and the taste of its complex society and government, readers may not mind Donata's seeming immunity to the mores and prejudices of her day..."

References

2002 American novels
Novels set in Venice
Fiction set in 1592
American young adult novels
Wendy Lamb Books books